Bill Hutson, also known as William R. Hutson, (September 6, 1936 – September 21, 2022) was an African-American abstract fine artist, specializing in painting and collage, active since the early 1960s. Based in Lancaster, Pennsylvania, Hutson was active as a painter until his death, working in large format because he became legally blind due to glaucoma.

Biography 

Hutson was born in San Marcos, Texas, on September 6, 1936. His father, Floyd Hutson, was a musician, who died when Hutson was four years old. Hutson's mother was a custodian, and she died several years after his father, leaving Hutson and his siblings to live with relatives. Hutson drew throughout his childhood, and took a correspondence course in drawing, but was not aware of art as a career until his late teens. He died in Lancaster, Pennsylvania, on September 21, 2022.

Education 

Hutson completed his high school education in San Marcos, Texas, before enlisting in the United States Air Force. While serving, he took a drawing course at the University of New Mexico in Albuquerque from 1956 to 1957. He additionally studied art at Los Angeles City College, Los Angeles Trade Technical College, and the San Francisco Academy of Art in the late 1950s and early 1960s.

In addition to his studies at several colleges and universities, Hutson also completed an apprenticeship with the artist Frank N. Ashley from 1960 to 1962.

Career and travels 

From 1963 to 1970, Hutson traveled extensively throughout Europe, visiting cities such as Rome, Paris, London, and Amsterdam. During this time, Hutson's art was exhibited throughout the continent, and as a result, his art resides in many European collections.

In the years following his European travels, Hutson worked a variety of positions, both in museums and academia, including:

 1974-1976: Graphic Arts Advisor, Audio Visual Research Division, The National Museum of Art, Lagos, Nigeria
 1979-1983: Adjunct Lecturer, Hunter College of the City University of New York, New York, NY
 1984-1987: Assistant Professor, The Ohio State University, Columbus, OH
 1989: Visiting Artist/Instructor, The Johns Hopkins University, Baltimore, MD 
 1989-2010: Associate Art Professor, Franklin & Marshall College, Lancaster, PA
 2005-2022: Jennie Brown Cook and Betsy Hess Cook Distinguished Artist-in-Residence, Franklin & Marshall College, Lancaster, PA

Exhibitions 

Hutson's art has been exhibited internationally, in both group and solo exhibitions since 1964. In 2020, Hutson's art was featured in a solo exhibition, titled Bill Hutson: Selections from the Phillips Museum of Art at Franklin & Marshall College, Pennsylvania at the Governor's Residence in Harrisburg, PA. In 2021, Hutson's art was featured in a solo exhibition at Texas State Galleries in his hometown of San Marcos, TX, as well as a group exhibition at The Art Students League in New York, NY.

Notably, in 2004, Hutson curated an exhibition for the Phillips Museum of Art at Franklin & Marshall College, titled Something To Look Forward To. Featuring work by acclaimed artists Howardena Pindell, Alvin Loving, Edward Clark, and Sam Gilliam, among others, the exhibition celebrated the art of selected African-American artists over the age of 60.

Awards and recognition 

Hutson received several awards and public recognition throughout his career. In 1972, he received the Cassandra Foundation Award. In 1974, he was granted a fellowship through the National Endowment for the Arts in the amount of $7500. In 1980, Hutson received recognition through the Creative Artists Public Service Program (CAPS) in New York, NY.

Collections 

Hutson's art has been collected by museums and private collectors all over the world. His art is held at: 
 Editions Georges Visat, Paris, France
 Brandywine Graphic Workshop, Philadelphia, PA
 The Arco Collection, Philadelphia, PA
 Columbus Museum of Art, Columbus, OH
 Studio Museum in Harlem, New York, NY
 James E. Lewis Museum of Art, Morgan State University, Baltimore, MD
 Newark Museum, Newark, NJ
 Boysmans-Van Beuningen Museum, Rotterdam, Netherlands
 National Museum of Southern Australia, Adelaide, Australia
 San Francisco Museum of Modern Art, San Francisco, CA
 National Museum of Fine Arts, Havana, Cuba
 Brooklyn Museum of Art, Brooklyn, NY
 Schomburg Center for Research in Black Culture, The New York Public Library, New York, NY
 Columbus Museum of Art, Columbus, OH
 Petrucci Family Foundation Collection 
 Peter Stuyvesant Collection
 Roberto Matta-Echaurren Collection
 The Phillips Museum of Art, Franklin & Marshall College, Lancaster, PA

Franklin & Marshall College 

Hutson became involved with Franklin & Marshall College in 1989, when he joined the faculty. He taught in the art department from 1989 to 1999. In 2010, Hutson donated a collection of his art and his personal library and papers, including substantial archival materials, to the college. The collection is shared by the Phillips Museum of Art and the Franklin & Marshall College Library. Hutson was the Jennie Brown Cook & Betsy Hess Cook Distinguished Artist-in-Residence at the college, a position he had held since 2005.

References

External links

Living people
1936 births
Blind artists
American blind people
People from San Marcos, Texas
20th-century African-American painters
21st-century African-American artists
African-American painters
African-American United States Air Force personnel
Hunter College faculty
Ohio State University faculty
Franklin & Marshall College faculty